St. Peter's Roman Catholic Church is located on West Street, Drogheda, County Louth, Ireland. 
Designed by J. O'Neill and W.H. Byrne and built in the French Gothic style of local limestone ashlar in 1884. The church is famous for its tall west gable, rose window and for containing the national shrine of St. Oliver Plunkett.

History

During the time of the Penal Laws, Catholic chapels were barred within a town's walls. Therefore, Drogheda's Catholic chapel was outside the Westgate and was inadequate for the needs of the populace. A plot of land on a suitable site in West Street (Drogheda's main street) was persistently refused by the corporation. Eventually, through the influence of a Mr. Chester, who was a wealthy Catholic, a lease was finally secured.

A ceremony was held for all to witness Richard O'Reilly, Archbishop of Armagh and Primate of all-Ireland laying the foundation stone. Although the occasion was marred by an unseemly interruption, when the Mayor and Drogheda corporation arrived at the ceremony wearing their official regalia, with the Mace and Sword of state being borne before them, to confront the Archbishop. They warned him that a 'Popish Chapel' would not be tolerated within the town walls.

Sir Edward Bellew of Barmeath Castle, a Catholic, stepped forward and convinced the mayor and corporation and their fellow travelers to withdraw. The proceedings continued without further ado and the foundation stone was duly laid.

The first Church on the site was completed in 1793 to a design by Francis Johnston (who designed the spire of the nearby Church of Ireland of the same name) to a cost in the region of £12,000.

Present building

The façade of St. Peters is an imposing structure in the French Gothic Revival style, built of local limestone. It is one of the most notable buildings on West Street in the town centre of Drogheda. The building from 1793 was partly incorporated into the present building. The tower of the church is very similar to that of St. Patrick's Church in Dungannon, County Tyrone.
A detail image of that building is held at the Highlanes Gallery, illustrated on a mid 19th Century (ca. 1861) map of the town created by Isaiah Rowland CE.

The Church is famous for housing the National Shrine to St. Oliver Plunkett, who was martyred at Tyburn in 1681. The shrine is most elaborate and contains the preserved head of the saint. Another showcase displays his shoulder blade and other bones as relics. Also on exhibit is the cell door of Newgate prison in which he spent his last days.

The Church is a prominent tourist attraction but signs urge silence and remind people that they are in a sacred place.

Gallery

External links
 Official Website
 TripAdvisor
 Saint Peter's Church - Shrine Page

References 

Buildings and structures in Drogheda
Peter's, Drogheda
19th-century Roman Catholic church buildings in Ireland
Roman Catholic churches completed in 1884
Roman Catholic shrines in the Republic of Ireland
19th-century churches in the Republic of Ireland